Buckshot John is a 1915 American Western film that was directed by and starred Hobart Bosworth. Prints of the film survive in the Library of Congress film archive.

Cast
 Hobart Bosworth as "Buckshot John" Moran
 Courtenay Foote as Dr. Buchanan Gilmore / The Great Gilmore
 Carl von Schiller as Jimmy Dacey, a Reporter
 Helen Wolcott as Ruth Mason
 Herbert Standing as John Mason
 Marshall Stedman as Warden of state's prison
 Frank Lanning as Bad Jake Kennedy
 Art Acord as Hairtrigger Jordan
 Elmo Lincoln as The sheriff (as Oscar Linkenhelt)
 Rhea Haines as Mrs. Hayden
 Arthur Allardt as Medicine Show Crowd (uncredited)
 J.F. Briscoe as Medicine show crowd (uncredited)
 Mr. Fletcher as Judge (uncredited)
 Hoot Gibson as Medicine Show Crowd (uncredited)
 Wong Ling as Hindo (uncredited)
 Martha Mattox as Medicine Show Crowd (uncredited)
 Robert Murdock as Turnkey (uncredited)
 Ray Myers as Medicine Show Crowd (uncredited)
 Joe Ray as Medicine Show Crowd (uncredited)

See also
 List of American films of 1915
 Hoot Gibson filmography

References

External links
 
 

1915 films
1915 Western (genre) films
American black-and-white films
Surviving American silent films
Silent American Western (genre) films
1910s American films
1910s English-language films